Longstreet or Long Street may refer to:

Places
Longstreet, Louisiana, a village
Longstreet, Mississippi, an unincorporated community
Long Street, Buckinghamshire, England
Longstreet, Wiltshire, England

Streets
Long Street (Cape Town), a popular entertainment district in Cape Town, South Africa
Long Street (Tetbury), a popular antique shop street in Tetbury, UK

Other uses
Longstreet (surname)
Longstreet (TV series), a television series about a blind detective
Longstreet (film), a made-for-television movie
Operation Longstreet, a 2003 coalition military operation of the Iraq War